Villers-le-Sec is a commune in the Meuse department in Grand Est in north-eastern France. Its epithet "Sec" (dry) comes from the fact that no rivers pass through Villers-le-Sec, which is located on the plateau between the rivers Ornain and Saulx. However, the village is not completely deprived of water since it is located above a water table and there are many ponds.

History
Villers-le-Sec had more than 500 inhabitants in the middle of the 19th century, when an iron mine was operated near the village. Forestry remains a significant resource today. The only industry which remains today is a distillery, which produces mirabelle brandy during the low season.

See also
Communes of the Meuse department

References

Villerslesec